Wade Allen Blasingame (born November 22, 1943) is an American former professional baseball player and left-handed pitcher who appeared in 222 games in Major League Baseball for the Milwaukee / Atlanta Braves, Houston Astros and New York Yankees from  through .

Blasingame was a pitching star at Theodore Roosevelt High School in Fresno, California, prior to his professional career, compiling a perfect, 26–0 won–lost record over the course of his schoolboy career. He signed with the Braves in 1961 for a $125,000 bonus. In 38 games, including 36 starts, Blasingame set personal bests in games won (16), complete games (10), innings pitched (224) and strikeouts (117). He also was the top-fielding pitcher in the National League, handling 62 chances without an error.

The following June, he was traded to Houston, where he won only 17 of 45 decisions over all or parts of six seasons, not including a 16-game stint with Triple-A Oklahoma City in 1970. Blasingame finished his MLB career with the Yankees in 1972 pitching mainly out of the bullpen.

In his ten seasons in MLB he had a 46–51 record in 222 games pitched (128 as a starter), with a 4.52 earned run average and a 1.462 WHIP. He was credited with 16 complete games, two shutouts, 31 games finished and five saves. In 863 innings pitched, he allowed 891 hits, 486 runs, 434 earned runs, 75 home runs and 372 bases on balls. He had 512 strikeouts, 30 hit batsmen and 62 wild pitches, while facing 3,763 batters. He was charged with 32 intentional walks and one balk.

In 1985, Blasingame was inducted into the Fresno County Athletic Hall of Fame.

References

External links

1943 births
Living people
Atlanta Braves players
Austin Senators players
Baseball players from New Mexico
Boise Braves players
Denver Bears players
Hawaii Islanders players
Houston Astros players
Major League Baseball pitchers
Milwaukee Braves players
New York Yankees players
Oklahoma City 89ers players
People from Deming, New Mexico
Richmond Braves players
Sportspeople from Fresno, California
Tulsa Oilers (baseball) players
Wichita Aeros players